Behind Monastery Walls may refer to:

 Behind Monastery Walls (1928 film), a 1928 German silent drama film
 Behind Monastery Walls (1952 film), a 1952 West German drama film